Charest is a surname. Notable people with the surname include:

Benoît Charest (born 1964), Canadian composer and guitarist
Isabelle Charest (born 1971), Canadian short track speed skater
Jean Charest (born 1958), Canadian lawyer and politician, Premier of Quebec
Johanne Charest (born 1975), Canadian chess master
Micheline Charest (1953–2004), Canadian television producer
Nancy Charest (1959–2014), Canadian politician
Réal Charest, Canadian politician
Solange Charest (born 1950), Canadian politician
Travis Charest (born 1969), Canadian comic book artist, penciller and painter